Maşat Höyük is a Bronze Age Hittite archaeological site 100 km nearly east of Boğazkale/Hattusa, about 20 km south of Zile, Tokat Province, north-central Turkey, not far from the Çekerek River. The site is under agricultural use and is plowed. It was first excavated in the 1970s.

During the Hittite period, it is believed to have been named Tappika (Tabigga, Tabikka).

History
The site dates back to at least the Early Bronze Age. Most of the EBA remains on the upper city were destroyed in the construction of the Hittite palace. Some remain in the lower town.

The enigmatic marauding Kaskas burned this site during Tudhaliya II's reign. The Hittites rebuilt it under the next king Suppiluliuma I.

Cuneiform tablets from the site form a new archive of Hittite texts. The letters found at Masat Höyük were edited by Sedat Alp in a two-volume edition in Turkish and German in 1991. Most tablets here are correspondence between the site and the Hittite king, a "Tudhaliya" who was probably Tudhaliya II; most concern the Kaska front. The Hittites' capital at this time was either Sapinuwa (which has been found) or else Samuha (which has been identified since 2005 based on archives). One place-name mentioned in the texts is Tabigga/Tabikka, which is now generally considered to be the Hittite name of the Maşat Höyük site.

The site also contains 14th-century BC Helladic period ware from mainland Greece.

Archaeology
The site of Maşat Höyük measures 450 by 225 meters, with a lower town and an upper citadel area which stands 29 meters above the plain. A cuneiform tablet was found on the surface by H. G. Güterbock in 1943 and published. A small excavation resulted in 1945. Full excavation did not begin until 1973, sponsored by the Turkish Historical Society.

Wood collected by field archaeologist Tahsin Özgüç of Ankara University at the upper Hittite level at Masat Höyük has been added to the Aegean Dendrochronology Project, a 30-year-long project established to build tree-ring chronologies for the Eastern half of the Mediterranean. The wood, which was tentatively dated to 1353 BCE, was retrieved from an excavation site of a building where archeologists also had found imported Late Helladic IIIA/B Stirrup jars, a famous form of pottery. In 2005, the project published an updated report on the dendrochronology research results for Anatolia.

See also
Cities of the ancient Near East

Notes

References
Alp, Sedat, 1991. Maşat Höyük'te Bulunan Çivi Yazılı Hitit Tabletleri, Hethitische Keilschrifttafeln aus Maşat-Höyük (Cuneiform Tablets Found in Maşat-Höyük), (series Türk Tarih Kurumu Yayinlari, VI. vol. 34)
---, 1991. Hethitische Briefe Aus Masat-Hoyuk(series Türk Tarih Kurumu Yayinlari, VI. vol. 35)
Özgüç, T. 1978. Masat Höyük Kazilarive Çevresindeki Arastirmlar: Excavations at Masat Höyük and Investigations in its Vicinity, Ankara (TTK Yayinlari, V Dizi – Sa. 38).  Turkish/English text
Yakar, Jak, "Excavations at Masat Hoyuk and Investigations in Its Vicinity"  Journal of the American Oriental Society 100/2, pp 175–177, 1978
T. Özgüc, Masat Höyük, 11, A Hittite Center Northeast of Bogazköy, ser. V. no. 38a, Türk Tarih Kurumu Yayinlari, 1982

External links
TAY Project: Destruction report

Tokat Province
Hittite sites in Turkey
Archaeological sites in the Black Sea Region